Murgah may refer to:
 Murgah, Sepidan, Fars Province
 Murgah Kakan, Kohgiluyeh and Boyer-Ahmad Province